WPXZ-FM is a commercial FM radio station licensed to Punxsutawney, Pennsylvania, known as the "Weather Capital of the World". The station operates at a federally assigned frequency of 104.1 MHz and an effective radiated power of 3,000 watts. WPXZ, and its co-located sister stations, WECZ and WKQL, are all owned by Pittsburgh-based Renda Broadcasting Corporation.

WPME-FM Punxsutawney, a "shadow" of its AM sister
Signing on at 105.5 MHz, WPXZ originated in December 1973 as WPME-FM, simulcasting with its then same-named daytime only AM sister station, known today as WECZ. The stations were owned by the Punxsutawney Broadcasting Company, headed by Clearfield County native and Punxsutawney resident Charles M. "Charlie" Erhard Jr. (April 30, 1928 - July 12, 2004), who sold the stations to its present owner in 1981.

That year, the station pair would both be rebranded as WPXZ-AM-FM, continuing with simulcasting until 1989, when management finally began separate broadcasts. Seeing the FM station as the driving force of the two, the AM station would be rebranded under the WECZ call sign.  

While WECZ would adopt a format featuring big band, swing and other types of nostalgia music aimed at an older demographic and branded as "Easy 1540," WPXZ-FM continued operating under an adult contemporary format, albeit with a full service mindset. In addition to music the station's programming featured hourly ABC national news, high school sports and Pittsburgh Pirates baseball broadcasts, and a wide variety of other, locally-themed programming. The station would also operate a second studio/office location in nearby Brookville for a period of 15 years, ending in the mid-1990s.

Then and now, WPXZ has provided a unique proving ground for young, up and coming radio talent. Dave Walters, Alan Freed, D.P. McIntire, Lou Jordan and numerous others would take to the air and thrive in the format, albeit not always without incident. For instance, Freed recounted this story to 440.com...

"We were only on the air from 6am to midnight, so the first person on the air in the morning had to cross his fingers and hope that the transmitter (known to us as "Eileen" — as in "Come on Eileen") would actually start when we fired it up. I came in to do my Sunday morning shift (I was the lucky 16 year old who ran the "God Squad" tapes at the time), and the transmitter wouldn't start. I drove up to the transmitter building to try a trick that the program director (Larry Rembowski) had taught me. "Slam the door of the transmitter if it doesn't start," he told me. I interpreted this to mean, "Slam the door of the shack that housed the transmitter." This made no sense to me, but I tried it. I slammed the door on the shack repeatedly with no luck. I got angry and decided to try a bit more unorthodox method... I decided to ram my car into the building to see if that would make it go (what the heck, it wasn't exactly a Porsche!) Needless to say, this didn't help either. It wasn't until later that I learned that there was a metal door on the transmitter itself that you could slam to get it to start (this method actually worked most of the time!) The car died years ago, but the building is still doing fine, thank you very much."

WKQL: another station joins the fray
In 1996, Renda received permission to put another FM station on the air. In order for the new station to go on the air, many existing FM stations would have to shuffle their frequencies in order to fit the channel in its assigned community of Brookville, some 15 miles away from Punxsutawney. One of the affected stations was WPXZ. Renda gave up the 105.5 frequency for WPXZ to move to 104.1. The new Brookville station debuted in 2000 under an oldies format, the call letters WBEU (later changed to WYTR and then WMUV for a week, and finally WKQL as of October 2006) and the moniker "Kool 103.3."

In a 2004 management change, WPXZ moved to more CHR-based adult contemporary format in an effort to hip up WPXZ's stodgy image of tired music. The change also resulted in scaling back the station's news content, which did not go over well with listeners.

WPXZ today
In April 2005, WPXZ underwent management changes at the administrative, programming and sales levels. Increased efforts at local news and sports, as well as community-oriented events, resulted in a very successful turnaround for all three stations. The music also shifted from a CHR-based AC to a 1980s oldies based AC, which improved listenership.

Yearly, on Groundhog Day, the song "Groundhog Groundhog" by Brave Combo is played.

External links
WPXZ-FM official website

PXZ-FM
Mainstream adult contemporary radio stations in the United States
Renda Broadcasting radio stations